J. Russell Eshback (April 28, 1898 – August 24, 1981) was a Republican member of the Pennsylvania House of Representatives.

References

Republican Party members of the Pennsylvania House of Representatives
1898 births
1981 deaths
20th-century American politicians
People from Pike County, Pennsylvania